Paul Wevers (21 July 1907 – 6 March 1941) was a German sprint canoeist, born in Cologne, who competed in the late 1930s. He won a gold medal in the K-2 10000 m event at the 1936 Summer Olympics in Berlin.

Wevers was killed during World War II on 6 March 1941 in Braunschweig, Niedersachsen, Germany when his plane crashed into the ground.

References

External links
DatabaseOlympics.com profile
Sports-reference.com profile

1907 births
1941 deaths
Sportspeople from Cologne
Canoeists at the 1936 Summer Olympics
German male canoeists
Olympic canoeists of Germany
Olympic gold medalists for Germany
Olympic medalists in canoeing
Medalists at the 1936 Summer Olympics
German military personnel killed in World War II